Velimir Zajec (born 12 February 1956) is a Croatian professional football manager and former player who last managed Dinamo Zagreb.

Club career
Zajec began his career at Dinamo Zagreb in 1974, aged 18. During 10 years at the club, he helped them to two domestic cup wins, as well as the league title, their first title honour in 24 years.
In 1979 and 1984, he was named the Yugoslav Footballer of the Year.

He then transferred to Greek club Panathinaikos, for whom he was tremendously successful, playing over 100 games.
He was also one of the best players at the time.

International career
Zajec made his debut for Yugoslavia in a March 1977 friendly match against the Soviet Union and earned a total of 36 caps, scoring 1 goal. He captained them at both the 1982 World Cup and the 1984 European Championship. His final international was an October 1985 friendly away against Austria.

Coaching career
Following retirement, he spent two years (1989–1991) as Director of Football at former club Dinamo Zagreb before returning to Panathinaikos to run their academy. Before long, he was promoted to head coach of the club. After a period he again, he returned to Zagreb, this time as head coach, before moving once more back to Panathinaikos in 2002 to become Director of Football.

In late October 1998, Zajec replaced Zlatko Kranjčar as manager at Dinamo Zagreb (then known as Croatia Zagreb), following Kranjčar's poor record in the UEFA Champions League group stage, where the team only managed to grab a single point in three matches (drawing with Ajax at home, before losing to both Olympiacos and Porto on the road). The team's performance in the UEFA Champions League improved under Zajec, as they managed to stay undefeated in the remaining three group matches, beating Porto and Ajax and drawing with Olympiacos. Dinamo nevertheless did not manage to go through to the quarter-finals after finishing second in their group, behind Olympiacos (at the time, only the first-place finishers and the two best second-place finishers went through).

In 2004, he moved to English club Portsmouth to take up a position as executive director. He took over as temporary team manager following the resignation of Harry Redknapp in November 2004 and was confirmed as the new manager on 21 December 2004 making him the first Croatian to manage in the Premier league. Five months later, he reverted to his intended director's role, following the arrival of Alain Perrin. He resigned from his position at Fratton Park on 10 October 2005 due to personal reasons.

On 25 May 2010, Zajec was appointed new coach at Dinamo Zagreb, returning to the club as coach after 11 years. However, Zajec was sacked on 9 August 2010, after leading Dinamo in just 8 competitive matches, winning the 2010 Croatian Supercup, exiting the 2010–11 Champions League in the third qualifying round, and picking up four points in the first three matches in the 2010–11 Prva HNL.

Honours 
Yugoslav First League: 1982
Yugoslav Cup:1980, 1983
Alpha Ethniki: 1986
Greek Cup: 1986, 1988

References

External links
 
Velimir Zajec profile at the Serbia national football team website 

1956 births
Living people
Footballers from Zagreb
Association football midfielders
Association football defenders
Yugoslav footballers
Yugoslavia international footballers
1982 FIFA World Cup players
UEFA Euro 1984 players
GNK Dinamo Zagreb players
Panathinaikos F.C. players
Yugoslav First League players
Super League Greece players
Yugoslav expatriate footballers
Expatriate footballers in Greece
Yugoslav expatriate sportspeople in Greece
Croatian football managers
Panathinaikos F.C. managers
GNK Dinamo Zagreb managers
Portsmouth F.C. managers
Premier League managers
Croatian expatriate football managers
Expatriate football managers in Greece
Croatian expatriate sportspeople in Greece
Expatriate football managers in England
Croatian expatriate sportspeople in England
GNK Dinamo Zagreb non-playing staff
Panathinaikos F.C. non-playing staff
Portsmouth F.C. non-playing staff